Korneychuka Street is a street in the Bibirevo District, North-Eastern Administrative Okrug, Moscow.

Location
The course of the  river passes close to the street along an underground conduit, before re-emerging above ground near Leskov Street.

History 
The village was incorporated into the city districts in 1960 and began to be redeveloped. The last residential building in the former village of Podushkino was demolished in 1976. The majority of construction along the street was carried out between 1977 and 1980, and consisted primarily of 9-storey buildings, with a number of 12- and 16-storey buildings. In 1977 the street was named after Ukrainian playwright and literary critic Oleksandr Korniychuk, who had died in 1972.

In the 2000s, it was the location of the central office of the Moscow Department of the Federal Migration Service, with a cage for people. In 2011  took place on the street.

The street goes around the Bibirevo ethnographic village.

References

Sources 
 Общемосковский классификатор улиц Москвы ОМК УМ
 Имена московских улиц. Топонимический словарь / Р. А. Агеева, Г. П. Бондарук, Е. М. Поспелов и др.; авт. предисл. Е. М. Поспелов. — М.: ОГИ, 2007. — 608 с. — (Московская библиотека). — ISBN 5-94282-432-0

Streets in Moscow